The 19th South East Asian Junior and Cadet Table Tennis Championships 2013 were held at the Garden Square of the Harrison Plaza in Manila, Philippines.

Medal summary

Events

Medal table

See also

2013 World Junior Table Tennis Championships
2013 Asian Junior and Cadet Table Tennis Championships
Asian Table Tennis Union

References

South East Asian Table Tennis Championships
South East Asian Junior and Cadet Table Tennis Championships
South East Asian Junior and Cadet Table Tennis Championships
South East Asian Junior and Cadet Table Tennis Championships
Table tennis competitions in the Philippines
International sports competitions hosted by the Philippines
South East Asian Junior and Cadet Table Tennis Championships